Dick Flood (November 13, 1932 – January 9, 2023) also known as Okefenokee Joe, was an American singer, songwriter, entertainer, and environmentalist. In the mid-1950s he was part of the duo The Country Lads and made regular appearances on CBS' The Jimmy Dean Show. In 1959, Flood's cover version of "The Three Bells (The Jimmy Brown Story)" reached number 23 on the US chart. His songs have been recorded by popular artists including Roy Orbison, Anita Bryant, Billy Grammer, Kathy Linden, and The Wilburn Brothers. In 1962, The Wilburn Brothers recorded his song "Trouble's Back in Town", which peaked at number 4 on the US Country Chart and was named Cashbox Magazine’s “Country Song of the Year.” In 1973, Flood moved to Georgia's Okefenokee Swamp and became a professional naturalist and environmentalist. In 1981, Flood changed his name to Okefenokee Joe, and in 1989 he hosted and narrated the Emmy award-winning documentary Swampwise on Georgia Public Broadcasting.

Life as Dick Flood 
Dick (Richard) Flood was born in Philadelphia, Pennsylvania, United States, and began playing music while working as a counselor at a YMCA summer camp in the Blue Mountains. After the campers were in bed, he would practice guitar and perform for his fellow counselors.

Singer/performer

Military tours 
After serving in Korea with the U.S. Army, Flood organized his first country music band, The Luzon Valley Boys. During this time he also began writing songs, some of which were performed by the band. The Luzon Valley Boys played at the various military clubs on Clark Air Force Base in the Philippine Islands. On one occasion they performed for the Philippine president, Ramon Magsaysay.

The Jimmy Dean Show 
A few years later, Flood and army buddy, Billy Graves, auditioned for The Jimmy Dean Show. Dean asked them to perform together, so they formed the duo The Country Lads. In 1956, The Country Lads were given a regular spot on The Jimmy Dean Show, which aired on CBS every weekday morning. Like most of the Jimmy Dean Show performers, The Country Lads participated in a USO tour of Europe and Africa. In 1957 the Country Lads signed a contract with Columbia Records and released the single, “Alone In Love”/“I Won’t Beg Your Pardon” (Columbia #4-41062) and in 1958 they released the record  “Anything”/”Lonely Lover” (Columbia #4-41212). The Country Lads remained on the Jimmy Dean show for three years until 1958 when the show ended.

Performing in Nashville 
The Country Lads split up in 1958, and in 1959 Flood moved to Nashville to pitch his songs to the popular recording artists he had met on The Jimmy Dean Show. His preference was for songwriting, but his work as singer and entertainer was more profitable. While in Nashville, Flood landed a spot on the radio show Ernest Tubb Record Shop, and from there earned a spot performing on Friday Night Frolics (a Friday night spin-off of the Grand Ole Opry). In 1960-61, Flood was invited to sing almost every Saturday night for the Grand Ole Opry.

Songwriter

Major label success 
In 1958, Flood and Fred Foster co-wrote the Billy Graves' single "The Shag (Is Totally Cool)" (Monument Records -#45-MN.401) which reached number 53 on Billboard's Hot 100. Due to the song's success, Billy Graves was invited to tour with Dick Clark.

In 1959, Flood's song "Gee" was recorded by George Hamilton IV and released on his album Gee! (Hilltop JS-6161) as well as on his single "Gee" / "I Know Your Sweetheart" (ABC-Paramount 45-10028). "Gee" hit number 73 on the US charts.

In 1960, Roy Orbison recorded Flood's song "Here Comes That Song Again" for Orbison's album Lonely and Blue (Monument M 4002). The song was also released on Orbison's single "Only the Lonely" / "Here Comes that Song Again" (Monument #45-421).

In 1961, Anita Bryant recorded Flood's song "Cold, Cold Winter" on her single "Cold, Cold Winter" / "Step By Step, Little By Little" (Columbia #4-42257). It was later released on her 1963 album Anita Bryant's Greatest Hits (Columbia CS-8756).

In 1962, "Trouble's Back in Town" (Decca Records DL 4391) was recorded by The Wilburn Brothers and made it to number 3 on the Cashbox Country Singles chart, and number 4 on the US Country charts. It was also named Cashbox Magazine’s Country Song of the Year.

Flood's songs were often found on the B-side of popular singles, such as "Only The Lonely" by Roy Orbison, and Billy Grammer's "Gotta' Travel On" / "Chasing a Dream" (Monument #45-400) which led his friends in the music business to nickname him ‘Flip Side Flood’.

Recording artist 
In addition to songwriting, Flood also found success as a recording artist. In 1959, he recorded a cover version of The Browns' song "The Three Bells (The Jimmy Brown Story)", which was released almost a month after The Browns' version was released (RCA Victor #47-7555).  Both versions found simultaneous success on the charts with The Browns' version reaching number one, and Flood’s peaking at number 23. His follow-up singles at Monument, “It Only Costs A Dime” (Monument #45-414) and “Cowpoke,” (Monument #45-427-V) received little airplay. 
   
In October 1961, his single "The Hellbound Train" / "Judy Lynn" was released on Epic Records (Epic #5-9479). Each year, Columbia Records held a disc jockey convention in Nashville and invited disc jockeys from across the US to listen to Columbia artists perform their newly released music. Flood sang "The Hell Bound Train," and received considerable praise from his audience. However, because the lyrics included references to drunkenness, hell, and the devil, the song was banned from radio stations. It received little exposure and failed to chart.

In 1962, he released the single "King or a Clown" / "Never Has So Much Been Lost (In Just a Little While)" (Epic #5-9500). The same year he was voted by Cashbox as the “Most Up and Coming Male Vocalist in Country Music.” Flood also recorded the song "I'll See You to the Door" with Epic Records, but to Flood's dismay, they never released it. (In 2015 it was released on the album One Bright Morning by Fervor Records).

Dick Flood and the Pathfinders 
In 1964, Flood organized a three piece group named Dick Flood and the Pathfinders. In addition to recording and performing in the U.S., the band also toured the military club circuit. They visited Okinawa, Guam, The Philippines, and Vietnam. While on tour, Flood contracted Dengue Fever and became seriously ill. It took several years for him to fully recover.

When he returned to the U.S, Flood created his own music label, Totem Records. In 1967, Totem Records released two songs "Miung Sun Lee" / "Willow In The Wind" (Totem T-1). During 1968-1971, he had one single released on Nasco Records, entitled "Slow It Down" (written by Kris Kristofferson) / "Speak My Name" (written by Flood) (Nasco 025), and another release on Nugget Records, "Woman Leave Me Alone" / "Home Was Never Like This" (Nugget NR-1026). None of these songs did well in the charts and Flood was becoming discouraged.

Life as Okefenokee Joe

Environmentalist 
In 1973, Flood's second marriage was ending and his music career was struggling. Flood decided to leave it all behind and move to Georgia. He camped alone for four months until he found a job as the animal curator of the Okefenokee Swamp. For eight years he lived on the northern edge of Cowhouse Island. In 1976 he met Cindy Yeomans, who would  become his third wife. After the wedding, the couple moved to Odum, Georgia.

In 1981, Flood changed his name to Okefenokee Joe. He became an expert on wildlife and ecology and began to teach lessons through his ballads and wildlife demonstrations.

TV host and narrator 
In the late 1980s, he narrated and hosted two documentaries Swampwise and The Joy of Snakes.. He also created a DVD field guide Know Your Snakes – Venomous Snakes of the Southeastern United States. Beginning in 1991 he made several appearances on the Georgia Outdoor series produced by Georgia Public Broadcasting. He speaks and performs for schools, libraries, and seminars.

Legacy 
In November 2015, Flood was inducted into the Atlanta Country Music Hall of Fame. In recent years, Flood has worked with Fervor Records to release many of his previously unreleased recordings. The independent music label has also placed his music in television and film. Flood also owns his own record label, Cowhouse Island Records, and continues to write and record songs and albums about nature, simple living, and his faith.

Personal life and death 
Dick Flood had 5 boys and was the step father to 2 girls. He died on January 9, 2023

Discography

TV and film

References

External links

1932 births
Living people
American country musicians
American environmentalists
American male singer-songwriters
People from Philadelphia
Country musicians from Pennsylvania
Singer-songwriters from Pennsylvania